Matt Warburton (born February 7, 1978) is an American television writer.

Early life
Warburton grew up in northern Ohio and attended Strongsville High School. He has a degree in cognitive neuroscience from Harvard University.

Career 
Warburton worked for 11 years as a writer and co-executive producer on the Fox animated series The Simpsons, leaving the show in December 2012. He worked as a writer (consulting editor) on the NBC comedy series Community, joining during the show's third season and then became executive producer and writer for the Fox comedy The Mindy Project.

Work

The Simpsons episodes 

"Tales from the Public Domain" (Do the Bard, Man) (2002)
"Three Gays of the Condo" (2003)
"Co-Dependents' Day" (2004)
"The Father, the Son, and the Holy Guest Star" (2005)
"Please Homer, Don't Hammer 'Em..." (2006)
"Moe'N'a Lisa" (2006)
"Springfield Up" (2007)
"Treehouse of Horror XIX" (2008)
"The Squirt and the Whale" (2010)
"The Great Simpsina" (2011)
"A Totally Fun Thing That Bart Will Never Do Again" (2012)

Community episodes 

Digital Estate Planning (2012)

The Mindy Project episodes 

"In The Club" (2012)
"Danny's Friend" (2012)
"Music Festival" (2013)
"Crimes & Misdeamors & Ex-BFs" (2014)
"Danny Castellano Is My Nutrionist" (2015)
"C Is For Coward" (2015)
"The Parent Trap" (2015)
"When Mindy Met Danny" (2015)
"Will They or Won't They" (2016)
"Bernardo & Anita" (2016)
"Nurses Strike" (2016)
"Hot Mess Time Machine" (2017)
"May Divorce Be With You" (2017)
"Danny in Real Life" (2017)
"It Had To Be You" (2017)

Champions episodes 

"Vincemas" (2018)
"Nepotism" (2018)

Four Weddings and a Funeral episodes 

"Kash with a K" (2019)
"We Broke" (2019)
"New Jersey" (2019)

Awards

References

External links
 
 

1978 births
Living people
The Harvard Lampoon alumni
American television writers
American male television writers